Allan Campbell Ashbolt (24 November 1921 – 9 June 2005) was an Australian journalist, producer, and broadcaster.

Early life
He was born in Melbourne and attended Caulfield Grammar School, and served with the Australian Imperial Force in World War II. Following the war, Ashbolt began acting and helped establish the Mercury Theatre with Peter Finch amongst others. He appeared in government documentary films. Ashbolt was film librarian at NSW Film Council in mid-fifties, before he was hired by the Australian Broadcasting Corporation (ABC) as a producer.

Career
In 1959 he was appointed as the ABC's first North America correspondent, and during 1963 he served as a correspondent and executive producer of Four Corners, which has become Australia's longest-running investigative journalism/current affairs television program. He was known for his belief that the ABC should promote free speech and controversial political content.

Ashbolt held senior positions at the ABC until retiring after a 25-year career with the network, and also wrote for the New Statesman, a British political magazine. He died in Sydney in June 2005.

See also
 List of Caulfield Grammar School people

References

External links
 Retrieved 28 April 2017.

1921 births
2005 deaths
Australian television producers
Australian television journalists
People educated at Caulfield Grammar School
Australian Book Review people
Australian Army personnel of World War II
Journalists from Melbourne